Ravindu Laksiri (born 28 March 1996) is a Sri Lankan male professional squash player. He has represented Sri Lanka in several international squash competitions including the 2013 Men's Asian Individual Squash Championships, 2013 Asian Youth Games, 2016 South Asian Games,2019 South Asian Games,World Squash Doubles Championships,2018 Asian Games, 2014 Commonwealth Games and in the 2018 Commonwealth Games. Laksiri achieved his highest career ranking of 311 (PSA World Rankings) in 2022. He is the only player to have won the National title 9 times in a row. He also currently leads the Sri Lanka National Squash Team.

His highest achievement at the international junior level is 5th place in the 2013 Asian Youth Games.

Also, Finishing 10th in the world Doubles Championship 2019 is his first International Doubles victory. His Doubles playing partner is Shamil Wakeel. He won the 17th place in 2018 Commonwealth Games.

The school where Ravindu studied at D. S. Senanayake College.

He has won the DS Lion award for the best athlete of the year for 3 consecutive years at the school sports colors ceremony. Ravindu is the only student to have won the DS Lion award in 3 times. (2013,2014 & 2015)

He is one of only two Sri Lankan squash players apart from Mihiliya Methsarani set to represent Sri Lanka at the 2018 Commonwealth Games and scheduled to compete in the men's singles event.

References 

1996 births
Living people
Sri Lankan male squash players
Squash players at the 2014 Commonwealth Games
Squash players at the 2018 Commonwealth Games
Squash players at the 2018 Asian Games
Commonwealth Games competitors for Sri Lanka
Asian Games competitors for Sri Lanka
South Asian Games bronze medalists for Sri Lanka
South Asian Games medalists in squash